Fishs Eddy is a hamlet in Delaware County, New York, United States. Fishs Eddy has a post office with ZIP code 13774.

The hamlet has also given its name to a store selling dinnerware, flatware and glassware in the Gramercy Park area of New York City.

References

Hamlets in Delaware County, New York
Hamlets in New York (state)